Criticism of Twelver Shia Islam dates from the initial ideological rift among early Muslims that led to the two primary denominations of Islam, the Sunnis and the Shias. The question of succession to Muhammad in Islam, the nature of the Imamate, the status of the twelfth Shia Imam, and other areas in which Shia Islam differs from Sunni Islam have been criticized by Sunni scholars, even though there is no disagreement between the two sects regarding the centrality of the Quran, Muhammad, and many other doctrinal, theological and ritual matters. Shia commentators such as Musa al-Musawi and Ali Shariati have themselves, in their attempts to reform the faith, criticized practices and beliefs which have become prevalent in the Twelver Shia community.

Image veneration

Sunnis are particularly critical of the "love of visual imagery evident in Shia popular devotionalism" and regularly cite this characteristic (often referred to as 'Shia iconography') as proof of Shia deviance or heresy.

The paintings and pictures of Sunni royal families in countries such as Saudi Arabia, Bahrain and United Emirates are widespread, and disrespecting them in any way, including unofficial removal, is considered illegal and severely punished.   Such pictures can be found on the buildings or within them, including mosques.

Occultation

In the tradition of Twelver Shia Islam, the twelfth and final Imam, Muhammad al-Mahdi, who is also considered by Twelver Shia to be the prophesied redeemer of Islam known as the Mahdi, went into ghaybah ("occultation") in 873 CE. However, this belief has long been criticized by Sunni scholars who "often speculate that the twelfth Imam never existed, but was a myth designed to keep the Shia cause alive." Meanwhile, western scholars have also cast doubt upon the existence of an occulted Imam. According to Robert Gleave, the occultation of the 12th Imam "became subsequent orthodox doctrine" after none of the competing theories that sought to explain the succession to a childless 11th Imam "seemed satisfactory". According to Bernard Lewis, the occultation and subsequent return of the Imam became a characteristic Shi'ite doctrine following the "suppression of many risings and the disappearance of their leaders"; where the leader disappears and "his followers say that he is not dead; he has gone into concealment". With each new leader "who disappeared and did not return", this belief was "enriched" and became more detailed and "essential" as a "feature of Shia Islam."

However, according to Wilferd Madelung in Encyclopedia of Islam, the doctrine of the Occultation was well-documented by traditions of the Imams before the occultation of the Twelfth Imam whom the majority of the Imamiyya came to consider as the Mahdi after the death of the eleventh. As an example he mentions that "the pattern was already set in regard to Muḥammad b. al-Ḥanafiyya, whose death was denied by the Kaysāniyya [q.v.]. They believed that he was hidden in the mountains of Raḍwā and would return to rule the world. Similar beliefs arose around Muḥammad b. al-Ḥanafiyya's son Abū Hashim" Moreover, Madelung names several Sunni scholars who have similar beliefs. In a Hadith upon whose authenticity Shias and Sunnis agree, Muhammad had said, "If there were to remain in the life of the world but one day, God would prolong that day until He sends in it a man from my community and my household. His name will be the same as my name. He will fill the earth with equity and justice as it was filled with oppression and tyranny."  However, the majority of Sunnis do not consider the son of eleventh Imam as the promised Mahdi. Shias claim the only possible occasion that the son of eleventh Imam is said to have made a public appearance was at the time of his death, then as a child the boy was seen no more. His birth, Shia says, like the case of the prophet Moses, was concealed due to the difficulties of the time, and because of the belief that he was the promised Mahdi, the caliphs of the time had decided definitely to put an end to the Imamate in Shi'ism once and for all.

Nikah mut'ah
Nikah mut‘ah (lit. "pleasure marriage"), is a fixed-term marriage sometimes practiced in Twelver Shia Islam. The duration of this type of marriage is fixed at its inception and is then automatically dissolved upon completion of its term. For this reason, nikah mut‘ah has been widely criticised as the religious cover and legalization of prostitution. The Christian missionary Thomas Patrick Hughes criticized Mut'ah as allowing the continuation of "one of the abominable practices of ancient Arabia." The majority of Sunni scholars and Western writers have called it prostitution. Julie Parshall, Zeyno Baran, and Elena Andreeva have written that this kind of marriage is prostitution. According to Shahla Haeri, in Iran the middle class itself considers it to be prostitution which has been given a religious cover by the fundamentalist authorities.

Even though nikah  mutʿah is rejected by Sunni schools of law, there are several types of similar marriages including misyar, ʿurfi, halala marriages and in fundamentalist circles, jihad al nikah which are practiced in the Sunni world. None of which are accepted by the Shia Muslims because they are bid‘ah (innovation in religion), not found in the sunnah or the Quran as opposed to mut‘ah which was initially practiced and is found in both.
Nikah mut‘ah was practiced at the time of Muhammad and Abu Bakr, but was outlawed by the second Caliph, Umar ibn Khattab. Therefore, it is forbidden among Sunnis, but Shia consider Umar's account as legally and religiously invalid, as they argue it's legitimated by Quran . Shia have systematically contested the criticism that it is a cover for prostitution, and argue their rationales regarding the legal uniqueness of temporary marriage, which distinguishes Mut'ah ideologically from prostitution. Children born of temporary marriages are considered legitimate, and have equal status in law with their siblings born of permanent marriages, and do inherit from both parents. The bride must not be married, she must attain the permission of her wali if she has never been married before, she must be Muslim or belong to Ahl al-Kitab (People of the Book), she should be chaste, must not be a known adulterer, and she can only independently do this if she is Islamically a non-virgin or she has no wali (Islamic legal guardian). At the end of the contract, the marriage ends and the wife must undergo iddah, a period of abstinence from marriage (and thus, sexual intercourse). The iddah is intended to give paternal certainty to any children should the wife become pregnant during the temporary marriage contract. Some Shia scholars also view Mut'ah as a means of eradicating prostitution from society.

Taqiyya (dissimulation)
Taqiyyah is a Shi'ite practice under which it is permissible to hide one's faith and lie in order to preserve faith but only when there is a danger for one's life. The Shia have been criticised for this practice, an act deemed against the virtues of bravery and courage. Critics argue that the Twelvers have taken dissimulation far beyond life-threatening situations and have allowed its use in any scenario that is judged to benefit the continuation or propagation of the Twelver creed, as is emphasized by the "celebrated" reputed saying of the 6th Imam Ja'far al-Sadiq, "[t]aqiyyah is my religion and the religion of my forefathers"; along with his other often quoted saying from Kitab al-Kafi: "Nine tenths of faith is taqiyya." The practice is widely criticized by Sunni Muslims as indicative of the problems that they face when interacting with Shi'ites. According to Patricia Crone, Twelvers even extended the use of taqiyya  "to protect their secret wisdom from exposure to the uncomprehending masses (including their own co-religionists), who might pervert it or denounce it as heretical." This view has been supported by Faysal Noor in his book Taqiyyah: The Other Face. 

Such a doctrine became important where Shi'a communities lived under oppression and were stigmatised under Sunni authority in areas where Sunnis were the majority. Besides, the practice of concealing one's beliefs in dangerous circumstances originates in the Qur'an, which deems blameless those who disguise their beliefs in such cases. The practice of taqiyya in difficult circumstances is considered legitimate by Muslims of various sects. Sunni and Shia commentators alike observe that verse  refers to the case of 'Ammar b. Yasir, who was forced to renounce his beliefs under physical duress and torture. This practice was emphasized in Shia Islam whereby adherents may conceal their religion when they are under threat, persecution, or compulsion. Taqiyya was developed to protect Shia who were usually in minority and under pressure. In the Shia view, taqiyya is lawful in situations where there is overwhelming danger of loss of life or property and where no danger to religion would occur thereby. Shia commentators have argued that taqiyya has precedents from the time of Muhammad, including the story of Ammar ibn Yasir, Such commentators argue that to not avoid certain death is illogical, and that dissimulation is permissible under various circumstances, such as to preserve life, to protect the chastity of women, or avoid destitution.

Disrespect to Abu Bakr and Umar 
One allegation commonly leveled against the Twelvers is that they disrespect two of the Sunni Caliphs Umar and Abu Bakr, who supported Mohammad(s), as per Sunni belief, during the early days of the Islamic Ummah, but whom later betrayed The Prophet after his death and his household (Ahl al Bayt), as per Shi'ite belief. Such Shi'ite practices include the recited Dua Sanamain Quraish, which calls God's curse on the first two Sunni caliphs following Muhammad's death, Abu Bakr and Umar. Following the Safavid empire's conversion to the Shia sect of Islam, the first three caliphs, whom according to shia usurped Ali's rightful succession as first Caliph after The Prophet's death, were cursed during Friday sermons.

As Sunni scholar Shaykh Saleh Al-Fawzan summarises the views of the Rafidis as compared to the Nasibis:

The Raafidis are the opposite: they love the Prophet's family (ahl al-bayt) - or so they claim, but they hate the Saahaaba, whom they curse, denounce as kaafirs, and criticize.

During the 1960s, when an incipient ecumenical movement called for the unification of Shia and Sunni Islam, religious writers cited this "disrespect" for the Sahabah as a barrier to unification. In the 1980s and 1990s, three major religious writers in Egypt, Saudi Arabia, and Pakistan again cited this argument, noting that until all "profanity" against the Sahabah was abandoned, dialogue with Shia scholars could not begin.

In 2010, Ali Khamenei issued a fatwa which bans any insult to the companions of Muhammad, as well as his wives. The fatwa was issued in an effort to reconcile legal, social, and political disagreements between Sunni and Shia. Similar fatwas were issued from Ali al-Sistani and other Shiite Marja'.

However, some Shi'ite scholars in the past, such as Shaykh Tusi, Muhammad Baqir Majlisi, Sadiq Hussaini Shirazi, Abu al-Qasim al-Khoei, Hossein Vahid Khorasani, Ruhollah Khomeini, Mohammad Jamil Hammoud al-Amili, Yasser Al-Habib, cursed and/or allowed for disrespecting of the figures revered by the Sunnis.

Mourning of Muharram 

Twelvers have been criticised for the practice of Tatbir (a form of self-flagellation) during Ashura, the observation of the martyrdom of Husayn, traditionally accompanied by acts of ritual self-harm, which is often described as barbaric. The practice is contested among Shi'ite clerics: while traditionalist clerics allow believers to indulge in Tatbir, modernist clerics deem it not to be permissible because it is considered as self-damage and haram in Islam. Suffering and cutting the body with knives or chains was banned by the Shi'ite marja Ali Khamenei, Supreme Leader of Iran and by Hezbollah in Lebanon. Khamenei issued a fatwa on 14 June 1994 banning this practice. He considered it irreligious and not suitable for good Muslims.

According to Salafi Sunni scholars such as Ibn Taymiyyah and Abd al-Aziz ibn Baz, the celebration of Ashura is itself a blatant and primary example of the propensity of the Shia to indulge in Bid‘ah (religious innovation). They argue that the annual mourning occasion for Husayn (or any other individual) was never instituted or practiced by Muhammad — not even for his closest family members — and hence has no validity in Islam. Likewise, Ibn Rajab in his Kitab al-Iata'if argued against Ashura: "Neither God ..., nor His Messenger ... have ordered that days on which prophets met with calamities and the day of their death be instituted as a day of mourning. How much more is this true for a person lesser than they?"

Child Imams
Three of the Twelve Imams, held by the Twelver Shia to be God's representatives on Earth, were less than ten years old when they assumed the undisputed and exclusive leadership of the Twelver Shi'ite community. The 9th Imam, Muhammad al-Taqi, was  years old at the time he assumed the Imamate; the 10th Imam, Ali al-Hadi, was between 6.5 and 8.5 years, and the 12th and final Imam, Muhammad al-Mahdi, was  years old. Pakistani Islamic scholar and polemicist Ehsan Elahi Zaheer argues against the possibility of these personalities assuming the leadership of the Imamate at such young ages. Wilferd Madelung notes, however, that in Shi'ite belief, the knowledge of an Imam comes from "inspiration, not acquisition", and thus that even a young Imam is not considered unprepared, receiving revelation upon the death of his predecessor.

As for the ninth Imam, the Shia could not help asking from his father, the eighth Imam whether a child at that age could take on such a responsibility if something happened to Imam Ali al-Ridha; and al-Ridha used to illustrate the story of Jesus who was even younger when he had become the prophet of his time John the Baptist was also a child when he was given wisdom. His reading and understanding of the scriptures, surpassed even that of the greatest scholars of the time.

Shia'ites claim that their account of Al-Ma'mun's first meeting with Muhammad al-Jawad shows that wisdom is given to the Twelve Imams. After which the Caliph called together a great gathering in which all kinds of questions were asked from the young Imam, who astonished them all with his judgment and learning. Then al-Ma'mun declared formally that he gave him his daughter in marriage thereby.

However, Sunnis themselves believe that numerous lay people could assume a role of scholarly leadership at the very young age. Sunni Al-Tabari is said to have memorized the Qur'an at seven, was a qualified prayer leader at eight, began to study the prophetic traditions at nine, and left home to study when he was twelve.

The Twelver Imamah doctrine is not shared by the majority of Sunni Muslims. The Syrian Salafi mufti Ibn Taymiyyah (d. 728 AH/1328 AD) composed a long refutation of it in his Minhaj as-Sunnah an-Nabawiyyah. Numerous Shia scholars proved the concept of Imamah as being in the Qur’an; Usama al-Altar,  Moustafa al-Qazwini.

Infallibility of Imams
Twelver Shi'ism has been criticized for exaggerating the holiness and infallibility of its Imams. Al-Kulayni in al-Kafi claims that the Imams know when they die and they do not die unless by their own choice, they know everything in the past and in the future and every time when God informs Muhammad, He orders him to inform Ali too. In Islamic Government Khomeini writes: "Amongst the necessities in our doctrine is that our Imams have a dignity which no favored angel nor sent prophet could ever reach. As it has been narrated, the Imams were lights under the shadow of the throne before creating this world." According to critics this purity is close to that of the prophet Muhammad, if not quite on the same level, and reflects excessiveness of view. Shia Islam has been criticised for magnifying the role of the Imams alongside, or even above, that of Muhammad.

Both Shia and Sunni are in agreement over the two functions of prophet-hood: to reveal God's law to men, and to guide men toward God. However, while Sunnis believe that both have come to an end with the death of Muhammad, Shi'ites believe that whereas legislation ended, the function of guiding and "explaining divine law continued through the line of Imams." In Shi'ite theology, thus, God does not guide via authoritative texts (i.e. the Qur'an and Hadith) only but also guides through some specially equipped individuals known as Imams. This constitution, Shi'ites say, is not limited to Islam, but each great messenger of God had two covenants, one concerning the next prophet who would eventually come, and one regarding the immediate successor, the Imam. For example, Sam was an Imam after Noah, Ishmael was an Imam after Abraham, Aaron or Joshua after Moses, Simon, John and all the disciples after Jesus, and Ali and his descendants after Muhammad. It is narrated from the sixth Imam, Ja'far al-Sadiq, "where there to remain on the earth but two men, one of them would be the proof of God". The difference between apostles (Rasuls), the prophets (Nabi) and the Imams, thus, is described as follows: "Rasul sees and hears the angel in awakeness and sleep. Nabi hears the angel and sees him while asleep, but does not see him while awake though hears the speech. Imam (muhaddith) is the one who hears the angel in awakeness while does not see him in awakeness or sleep."
According to Shia, the status and authority attributed to Imams will be senseless if they are prone to the same weakness found in general people. God must assign someone similar to prophet in his attributes and Ismah as his successor to guide the people and to interpret the Quran.

Shi'ites claim their sources state that the Ahl al-Bayt, which are described purified of sin in the Verse of Purification, are Ahl al-Kisa, involving only specific members of the Prophet's family, and Shias claim this as an argument for their infallibility.

Fatimah's divine revelations
According to some Twelver Shia scholars, Muhammad's daughter Fatimah received divine revelations after her father's death. During the 75 days that Fatimah had contact and communication with Gabriel, her husband Ali wrote down and recorded the revelations that were made to Fatimah which she dictated to him, to form the Book of Fatimah.

Sunnis argue that Fatimah never received divine revelations from Allah. According to the Twelver Shi'ite fifth Imam, however, this kind of revelation is not the revelation of prophethood but rather like the inspiration (ilham) which came to Mary (mother of Jesus), the mother of Moses and to the bee.

Khums

Khums is a tax to pay one-fifth of Muslims' acquired wealth from certain sources toward specified causes. It is treated differently in Shi'ite and Sunni Islam. In Sunni Islam tradition, the scope of khums tax has been the spoils of war, while according to Twelver religious practice, Khums is an annual taxation on 20% of all profits. This wealth is collected and managed by Shi'ite religious leaders. However, according to scholars such as Musa al-Musawi, the modern development of the practice of collecting khums exclusively by Shia religious leaders, especially the Sayyid clerical elite, is simply a case of the usurpation of the place of the hidden Imam Mahdi, and as a way of enriching the clerical class.

Khums, according to Shiah, is divided into two portions. One portion went to the descendants of Muhammad, the other portion was divided equally and one part given to Imam and clergy, while the other part went to the orphaned and poor Muslims. Khums became a major source of income and financial independence of the clergy in Shi'ite regions. Shi'ites justify the practice of khums by the fact that unlike Sunni religious leaders, non-Iranian Shi'ite ones, are not state sponsored and supported in their mission. For example, Turkish "Presidency of Religious Affairs" only trains and employs all of Turkey's Sunni imams, as well as administers only Sunni worshiping places, despite the fact that Shias make up approximately 5% of Turkish citizens, and on non-voluntary basis, participate in the financing of the Sunni mosques and the salaries of Sunni imams, while their places of worship, which are not officially recognized by the State, do not receive any funding.

Three prayer times per day
While Sunnis have 5 salat (prayer) sessions per day, Twelvers can opt to pray the 5 daily prayers with only 3 prayer times per day by doubling their prayers on 2 occasions—combining the 2nd prayer with the 3rd and the 4th prayer with the 5th. However, Sunnis argue this very practice defeats the purpose of having 5 distinct prayers, since God ordered 5 prayers for 5 separate times of the day rather than 5 prayers for 3 separate times of the day and that Shia have misrepresented the ambiguity of the issue in the Quran for their own convenience. Twelvers extract this ruling from the two most important sources of jurisprudence which are the Quran, which only mentions 3 times for prayer, and the Sunnah of the Messenger Muhammad who was praying this way, as it is also reported by Sunni sources, thus they believe this backs their claims accepted within a Sunni point of view. It is even reported from the hadith that the Messenger did this so that no one among his Ummah should be put to [unnecessary] hardship however this can also be interpreted for people in long journey or ill health, Shias believe this is enough to reject any accusation of not basing their actions from Quran and Traditions.

Rejection of predestination

Most contemporary Twelvers are said to reject predestination. This has led to Sunni criticism of Twelvers, along with their associated belief in Bada' (change in God's will), as being deniers of God's complete sovereignty, and as being imitators of the Mu'tazila school of Islamic theology.

However some academics insist that Bada' is not rejection of predestination.

Shia states that matters relating to the human destiny is of two kinds: definite and indefinite; to explain the definitive one, Shia argues that God has definite power over the whole of existence, however, whenever He wills, He can replace a given destiny with another one; and that is what is called indefinite destiny. Some of these changes of destiny, thus, are brought about by man himself, who can through his free will, his decisions, and his way of life—lay the groundwork for a change in his destiny as pointed out in the verses: Truly, God will not change the condition of a people as long as they do not change their state themselves. Both types of destinies, however, are contained within God's foreknowledge, Shia argues, so that there could be no sort of change (Bada) concerning His knowledge. So the first type of destiny does not mean a limitation of God's power; since God, in contrast to the belief of Jews who says ‘the hand of God is tied’ asserts: Nay, His hands are spread out wide .... So God has the power to change everything he wills and God's creativity is continuous. Accordingly, as Sobhani puts it, "all groups in Islam regard "bada" as a tenet of the faith, even if not all actually use the term."

Corruption of the Quran

Twelvers are often criticised by Sunnis for believing that the Quran was altered by the Sahaba (companions of Muhammad). Groups such as the Deobandis accuse Twelvers of believing that the complete version of the original Quran is in the possession of their 12th Imam. Twelvers are also accused of believing that the present Quran is omitted of the verses which support the Imamate of Ali because Caliph Uthman removed them during his compilation of the book — noting the incompatibility of the belief that the codification and propagation of the Quran was truthfully undertaken by the Sahaba, who, in Shi'ite tradition, represent the earliest people to take the Caliphate from its rightful claimants  and to have corrupted the religion of Islam. As a result, such Sunni groups reject the Shi'ite defense that they believe in the same Quran as Sunnis, accusing Shi'ites of lying in line with their practice of taqiyyah so as not to expose themselves to the certain Sunni backlash.

Most of Shi'ites nowadays believe that nothing have been omitted or added to the Quran, however, traces of earlier views can be found in some books of Shi'ite ahadith like Bihar al-Anwar. The contemporary Shi'ite scholar Abu al-Qasim al-Khoei states that even if the Book of Ali (a copy of Quran written by Ali containing Ali's commentary, which sometimes is called the Book of Ali) incorporated additions that are not part of the existing Quran, this does not mean that these additions comprised parts of the Quran, and have been dropped from it due to alteration. Rather, these additions were interpretations or explanations of what God was saying, or were in the form of revelations from God, explaining the intention of the verses in the Quran. These additions were not part of the Quran and not part of what the Messenger of God was commanded to convey to the Muslim community.

Karbala

Twelvers have been accused of raising Karbala in Iraq to holiness and prominence — which in itself is "frowned upon by Sunnis" — above even Mecca, Medina and Jerusalem. This belief is exemplified by the attribution of the title Karbala-i for one who has performed pilgrimage there (just as one who makes the Hajj is titled Hajji), its annual attraction of more pilgrims for Ashura and Arba'een than the Hajj (seen as "a counterweight and a challenge to the annual haj taking place in Mecca"), prostrating during salat on turbah, commonly made from the clay of Karbala, and to numerous ahadith attributed to the Imams which are interpreted by critics as placing the land of Karbala above the Kaaba.

Violence and persecution
Iran, the Twelver Shi'ite bastion, is accused of the persecution of its Sunni minority and the historical persecution of Sunnis since at least Safavid times, e.g. there are no Sunni mosques in any of Iran's large cities. It is also accused of supporting the suppression of Sunnis in such countries as Lebanon, Syria and Iraq, both directly and through the militias it funds, such as Hezbollah and the private militias in Iraq. Another common target of persecution by the Iranian Twelver religious establishment is the Baháʼí community, which itself is a religion that branched off from Shi'a Islam. However, Twelvers have themselves often been victims of Anti-Shi'ite violence.

See also
Criticism of Islam
Criticism of religion
Islamic schools and branches
Akhbari-Usuli Controversies
Shia–Sunni relations
Sunni fatwas on Shias

Notes

References

Sources
 

Twelver Shi'ism
Anti-Shi'ism
Criticism of Islam
Islam-related controversies